Donald Regeling (born 13 August 1955) is an Australian cricketer. He played in four first-class matches for Queensland in 1978/79.

See also
 List of Queensland first-class cricketers

References

External links
 

1955 births
Living people
Australian cricketers
Queensland cricketers
Cricketers from Queensland